Gorgo may refer to:
 Görgö, the Hungarian name for the town of Spišský Hrhov, Slovakia
Gorgo (mythology), a woman of king Aegyptus
Another name for Medusa, one of the three monstrous Gorgons in Greek mythology
Gorgo (film), a 1961 film, or its protagonist, the fictional giant monster Gorgo
Gorgo, Queen of Sparta (6th–5th century BC), queen of Sparta, daughter of king Cleomenes I and wife of king Leonidas I
681 Gorgo, an asteroid
Gorgo, a frazione (subdivision) of the comune of Latisana, Italy
Gorgo, a former brush-footed butterfly genus now included in Erebia
Gorgo, a character in the anime The Wonderful Adventures of Nils